The FX-501P and FX-502P were programmable calculators, manufactured by Casio from 1978/1979. They were the predecessors of the FX-601P and FX-602P.

It is likely that the FX-501P/502P were the first LCD programmable calculators to be produced as up until 1979 (and the introduction of the HP-41C) no manufacturer had introduced such a device.

Arithmetic
The FX-502P series use algebraic logic as was state-of-the-art at the time.

Display
The FX-501P and FX-502P featured a single line 7-segment liquid crystal display with 10 digits as main display. An additional 3 digits 7-segment display used to display exponents and program steps when entering or debugging programs and 10 status indicators.  The display was covered with a yellow filter,

Programming
The programming model employed was key stroke programming by which each key pressed was recorded and later played back. On record multiple key presses were merged into a single programming step. All operations fitted into one program step.

The FX-501P could store 128 steps, with 11 memory registers. The FX-502P had twice that capacity with 256 steps and 22 memory registers.

Conditional and unconditional jumps as well as subroutines were supported. The FX-502P series supported 10 labels for programs and subroutines called P0 .. P9. Each program or subroutine could have up to 10 local labels called LBL0 .. LBL9 for jumps and branches.

The FX-501P and FX-502P supported indirect addressing both for memory access and jumps and therefore the programming model could be considered Turing complete.

Since the FX-501P and FX-502P only employed a seven-segment display each program step was represented by a special 2-digit codes made up of the digits 0 .. 9 and the character C, E, F and P. The calculator came with a special overlay so the user did not need to memorize the mapping between code and actual command.

What differentiated the FX-501 / FX-502P from its competitors was that programming was retained in a battery-buffered memory when the calculator was turned off.

Programming example
Here is a sample program that computes the factorial of an integer number from 2 to 69. For 5!, the user would type 5 P0 and get the result 120. The whole program is only 9 bytes long.

Interface

The FX-501P and FX-502P used the FA-1 to store program and data to Compact Cassette using the Kansas City standard. The FA-1 also enabled the calculators to generate musical notes.

The FX-501P was used on the 1981 song Pocket Calculator by electronic music group Kraftwerk.

References

External links
 FX-501P and FX-502P on casio.ledudu.com maintained by ledudu.
 FX-502P Geek hosted by casio.ledudu.com
 FX-501P and FX-502P on RS-Key maintained by Viktor Toth.
 Casio FX-501P and Casio FX-502P on Voidware
 FX-502P Simulator

FX-502P
Products introduced in 1978